Atlas Pizza is a pizzeria with multiple locations in Portland, Oregon.

Description 
Atlas Pizza serves New York-style pizza. The Sluzrenko has pepperoni, pineapple, and jalapeño.

History 

The original pizzeria opened on Division Street in southeast Portland's Richmond neighborhood in 2014, using the space previously occupied by Road Runner Café. A second opened on North Killingsworth Street in the Humboldt neighborhood in 2017, and a third opened on Foster Road in southeast Portland's Foster-Powell neighborhood in 2019.

Eli Johnson and John Ricci are co-owners. The Black-owned business participated in Black Restaurant Week in 2021. During the COVID-19 pandemic, the business saw increased labor and product costs.

Reception 
Nathan Williams included Atlas Pizza in Eater Portland's 2021 list of "Where to Grab Pizza by the Slice in and Around Portland".

See also 

 List of Black-owned restaurants
 Pizza in Portland, Oregon

References

External links 

 
 Atlas Pizza at Zomato

2014 establishments in Oregon
Black-owned restaurants in the United States
Foster-Powell, Portland, Oregon
Humboldt, Portland, Oregon
North Portland, Oregon
Pizzerias in Portland, Oregon
Restaurants established in 2014
Richmond, Portland, Oregon